Robin Vik (born 5 February 1980 in Hradec Králové) is a Czech professional tennis player.

Vik turned professional in 1995 and he reached a career high ranking of World No. 57 in January 2006. Career highlight runs are reaching the semifinals of St. Petersburg in 2005 and the quarterfinals of Dubai and Munich in 2006. Notable victories include World No. 10 Gastón Gaudio at the 2006 World Team Cup in Düsseldorf, World No. 25 Tomáš Berdych at Dubai in 2006, World No. 27 and recent US Open semifinalist Mikhail Youzhny at St. Petersburg in 2005 and a declining World No. 27 and defending champion Guillermo Coria at Umag in 2006.

Vik was beaten in the first round of the 2006 Australian Open by Lleyton Hewitt in a tight 5-setter after leading 2 sets to 1.

Performance timeline

Singles

ATP Challenger and ITF Futures finals

Singles: 13 (11–2)

Doubles: 8 (4–4)

External links
 
 
 Robin Vik's profile at CBS Sportsline
 Interview with David Prinosil, Vik's former coach

1980 births
Living people
Czech male tennis players
Sportspeople from Hradec Králové